Events from the year 1835 in Spain.

Incumbents
Monarch - Isabella II
Regent - Maria Christina of the Two Sicilies
Prime Minister - 
 until 7 June - Francisco de Paula Martínez de la Rosa y Berdejo  
 7 June-14 September - José María Queipo de Llano Ruiz de Saravia, 7th Count of Toreno 
 14 September-25 September - José María Queipo de Llano Ruiz de Saravia, 7th Count of Toreno 
 starting 25 September - Juan Álvarez Mendizábal

Events
February 5 - Second Battle of Arquijas
April 20–22 - Battle of Artaza
April 28 - Lord Eliot Convention
July 16 - Battle of Mendigorría

Births
March 13 - José Ferrer, guitarist and composer (d. 1916)
March 30 - Francisco de Paula Martínez, Spanish zoologist (d. 1908)

Deaths
March 7 - Manuel Freire de Andrade
June 24 - Tomás de Zumalacárregui

See also
First Carlist War

References

 
1830s in Spain
Years of the 19th century in Spain